is a railway station on the Tobu Utsunomiya Line in Mibu, Tochigi, Japan, operated by the private railway operator Tobu Railway. The station is numbered "TN-35".

Lines

Station layout
The station consists of one island platforms connected to the station building by an underground passageway.

Platforms

Adjacent stations

History
Omocha-no-Machi Station opened on 1 April 1965.
From 17 March 2012, station numbering was introduced on all Tobu lines, with Omocha-no-Machi Station becoming "TN-35".

Surrounding area
Mibu Toy Museum
Omocha danchi

See also
 List of railway stations in Japan

References

External links

  

Railway stations in Tochigi Prefecture
Stations of Tobu Railway
Railway stations in Japan opened in 1965
Tobu Utsunomiya Line
Mibu, Tochigi